Santa Cristina d'Aspromonte is a comune in the Province of Reggio Calabria in the Italian region Calabria, located about  southwest of Catanzaro and about  northeast of Reggio Calabria. In 2022 there is less than 600. 

Santa Cristina d'Aspromonte borders the following municipalities: Careri, Cosoleto, Oppido Mamertina, Platì, San Luca, Scido.

Demographic evolution

References

Cities and towns in Calabria